The Hong Kong Socialist Democratic Party was a democratic socialist political party in Hong Kong was founded by Sun Pao-kang on 8 August 1964.

Overview
The party was composed of a group of liberal-minded Chinese who had settled in Hong Kong because of the rise of Communist Party in the mainland China, and had recognized the value of the British administration in Hong Kong.

Sun Pao-kang among his supporters, was a former Lieutenant-General in the National Revolutionary Army and the member of the China Democratic Socialist Party, who had become disaffected with Chiang Kai-shek's Kuomintang government however opposed Mao's Communist regime. They wished to build up a model for modern China under British protection in Hong Kong, as well as a third force between the leftist and rightist politics in the colony.

Platform
The main objects we are striving for are to realise the self-government, democracy , freedom, progress, prosperity and welfare of Hong Kong.
To achieve these aims, we are determined to adopt certain peaceful, steady, harmonious as well as democratic means.

Basing on the main principles of the above mentioned objects and means , we make the following proposals:
 That the colony of Hong Kong shall realise its self-government at the earliest date possible. Owing to the realistic conditions, the powers of diplomacy and defense should be reserved by the British government. The state of Hong Kong will participate in the British Commonwealth as one of the members.
 That Hong Kong be prepared for its self-government from this date:elected members be added to the current Legislative Council, to which greater responsibility shall be held by the current administrative organs. Consequently, the appointing of an organisation or the convening of an assembly represented by all trades of the colon y shall be made in order to formulate the constitution of Self-government of Hong Kong.
 That the Constitution of Self-government of Hong Kong shall model after the pattern of modern democratic countries. This shall protect all the rights and interest s entitled to the citizens of Hong Kong. The Legislative Organ shall be a Single-chamber system. All residents of Hong Kong having resided in the colony for a period of 7 years, attaining the age of 21, shall be entitled to vote, regardless of nationality, complexion , sex, and religion. The government of Hong Kong shall be elected from the people-elected Legislative Organ and shall be held responsible to the latter organisation.
 Upon the first convention of the people-elected Legislative Organ's meeting, the governor of Hong Kong shall officially promulgate the self-government of Hong Kong from date. The Governor of Hong Kong shall reserve the right to cast a final veto, if necessary, on all the resolutions adopted by the Legislative Organ. The appointment of a new Governor shall obtain the consent of the majority of the Legislative Organ of Hong Kong.
 That the economic policy of Hong Kong shall mainly aim at the acceleration of the welfare of the population. Though private-owned enterprises are to encouraged, those vitally concerned with the essential living of the population, but meapable [sic] of being properly run by private concerns shall be managed by the government. In a word, to develop free economy on the one hand and to lay out a concrete plan for the economic reconstruction as well as development of Hong Kong on the other shall be indispensable.
 That there have been certain unwholesome aspects in the society of Hong Kong and therefore proper conception s shall be established so as to rectify the evil moral influence, to lay the foundation of a democratic, free and equal society, as well as to realise the plans for social security to the best of our ability.
 That the educational and cultural policy of Hong Kong shall aim at the interchange of Chinese and western cultures, particularly in the absorption of excellent western culture, and the extension of the glory of Chinese traditions. Children of school-age shall be given free Primary Education .
 Among the many administrative affair s that either need renovations or improvements, the government of Hong Kong shall set up various committees to attend to the vital problems of the population, to make reports on the actual state of affairs, to be used as references in the renovations or improvements of the government affairs by the Legislative Organ.

Citations

1964 establishments in Hong Kong
Defunct political parties in Hong Kong
Political parties established in 1964
Political parties with year of disestablishment missing
Socialist parties in Hong Kong
Democratic socialism in Hong Kong